The Crossing of the Red Sea is a fresco  executed in 1481–1482 and located in the Sistine Chapel, Vatican City. Of uncertain attribution, it has been assigned to  Cosimo Rosselli.

History
On 27 October 1480 several Florentine painters  left for Rome, where they had been called as part of the reconciliation project between Lorenzo de' Medici, the de facto ruler of Florence, and Pope Sixtus IV. The Florentines started to work in the Sistine Chapel as early as the Spring of 1481, along with Pietro Perugino, who was already there.

The theme of the decoration was a parallel between the Stories of Moses and those of Christ, as a sign of continuity between the Old and the New Testament. A continuity also between the divine law of the Tables and the message of Jesus, who, in turn, chose Peter (the first alleged bishop of Rome) as his successor: this would finally result in  a legitimation of the latter's successors, the popes of Rome.

Among the several fresco in the cycle, that of the Passage of the Red Sea was the one with the most problematic attribution. Although the name of Ghirlandaio was made by several authorities, the work's style is more reminiscent of that of Cosimo Rosselli or Biagio d'Antonio.

Description

The scene is part of the chapel's Stories of Moses cycle, and, like other frescoes there, shows several scenes at the same time. The sequence begins from the right background, where Moses and Aaron are begging the pharaoh to free the Israelites. On the right are the Egyptian soldiers, shown in typical Italian Renaissance military garments, armor and weapons, who are drowning  after the Red Sea waters, which had miraculously opened to allow the Israelites to cross them, close around them. The pharaoh is portrayed in a frantic scream, while other figures try to return to the Egyptian shore by swimming. Before the army is a column hovering over the waters: this is a representation of the fire pillar sent by Yahweh to  scare the Egyptians.

In the upper central area is a hail storm, sent by God to punish the Egyptians. Also depicted are some sunrays and, more to the left, a rainbow,  symbols of the upcoming liberation for the Israelite people. Similar representation of meteorological phenomena were not uncommon in the 15th-century Italian art: other examples are Fra Angelico's Martyrdom of St. Mark on the Tabernacle of the Linaioli, and several Paolo Uccello's St.  George and the Drake.

On the left are the Israelites, led by a young Moses with the typical yellow garment and green cloak, and a command baton, after they have just crossed the sea. Their safeness is testified by the presence of recreational activities, such as the prophetess Miriam playing a chordophone in the foreground. They continue their trip in procession, disappearing on the left, in a naturalistic landscape. Details include a pet dog in the foreground, reminiscent of Benozzo Gozzoli's paintings in the Magi Chapel.

Sources

External links

1480s paintings
Paintings by Cosimo Rosselli
Paintings by Domenico Ghirlandaio
Sistine Chapel wall frescoes
Paintings depicting Moses
Paintings depicting figures from the Book of Exodus
Paintings in Rome
Dogs in art
Horses in art
Maritime paintings
Musical instruments in art